Genti Gjondedaj (born 23 June 1980) is an Albanian retired footballer who played the majority of his career as a versatile midfielder for Teuta Durrës in the Albanian Superliga.

External links
 

1980 births
Living people
Footballers from Tirana
Albanian footballers
Association football midfielders
Albania under-21 international footballers
FK Dinamo Tirana players
FK Tomori Berat players
KF Erzeni players
Flamurtari Vlorë players
KF Teuta Durrës players
FK Partizani Tirana players
KF Skënderbeu Korçë players
KS Kastrioti players
KS Shkumbini Peqin players
Kategoria Superiore players
Kategoria e Parë players